, alternatively rendered Umdloti and also known as Umdloti Beach, is a small resort village on the KwaZulu-Natal North Coast, South Africa that is situated at the mouth of the Mdloti River north of Durban and now forms part of eThekwini, the Greater Durban Metropolitan Municipality. The name Mdloti is the Zulu word for a species of wild tobacco that grows here.

Spelling change 

In November 2009, the eThekwini Metropolitan Municipality submitted a list of places in the municipality to the KwaZulu-Natal Provincial Geographic Names Committee to be changed from their anglicised names to the correct Zulu spelling. In the list, the village "Umdloti" was to be changed to "eMdloti" which meant the uppercase "U" would fall away and be replaced by a lowercase "e" and the Umdloti River was to be changed to "uMdloti River" which meant the '"U" in the spelling would change from an uppercase to a lowercase.

On 1 October 2010, the KwaZulu-Natal Department of Arts and Culture gazette the list of approved name changes which included the village of Umdloti and the Umdloti River. Ever since the name change, the South African National Roads Agency Ltd. (SANRAL) has changed the road signs on the N2 highway leading to and at the M27 Jabu Ngcobo Drive interchange and many news agencies like The Mercury and Northglen News use the spelling "eMdloti", however there are still several road signs that still remain with the spelling "Umdloti" and many Durbanites and residents and businesses of eMdloti still spell the town with its previous spelling.

Geography 

eMdloti is located on an ancient, mature sand-dune south of the uMdloti River and its estuary. The seaside village is located on the uMhlanga Coast, which stretches from the uMngeni River in the south to the uThongathi River in the north and alongside uMhlanga includes Durban North, uMhlanga, Mount Edgecombe, Verulam, oThongathi, La Mercy and Westbrook.

eMdloti is situated approximately 24 km north-east of Durban and 5 km south-east of the King Shaka International Airport. It is bordered by La Mercy to the north, the Indian Ocean to the east, Sibaya Coastal Forest Reserve to the south and the Sibaya mixed-use development to the west.

With the eMdloti's location on a large ancient sand-dune, the village is divided into two parts, an upper and lower area on the coastline.

Lifestyle 

eMdloti, although still a small, peaceful town is situated ten kilometers north of uMhlanga Rocks. It has two commercial centres, a post office and several restaurants. A natural rock pool by the beach creates a safe swimming area.

eMdloti has a permanent population of around 3,000 people but can increase by as much as tenfold during the Christmas and Easter holiday season. Due to eMdloti's single access road (M27) from the M4/N2 interchanges, the topography, the fact that North and South Beach Roads are both cul-de-sacs and limited public parking, the repercussions of the seasonal holidaymaker influx results in traffic congestion and frequent gridlock, mainly at year-end.

eMdloti is famous for dolphins that swim very close to the beach early morning and July to November is a good time for whale watching when whales are often spotted from the beach.

eMdloti's real estate consists of full title, free-standing homes, mainly on the South Beach and sectional title apartments, located mostly on North Beach. Much of the latter is owned by non-residents as holiday homes or rental properties.

Developments 

Lying above eMdloti, to the west of the village is the Sibaya Coastal Precinct development spearheaded by Tongaat Hulett Developments. The land which was previously part of a sugarcane plantation known as Bellamont Estate is now being developed as mixed-use development node consisting of luxury apartments, offices, retail space and residences.

Part of the development, is the well-established Sibaya Casino and Entertainment Kingdom, owned by Sun International, one of South Africa's largest resort hotel chain and casino destination and is located to the south-west of eMdloti and between the N2 and M4 highways.

Infrastructure

Roads 

eMdloti has access to two major highways, the M4 and the N2 and one metropolitan route, M27.

The M4 Ruth First Highway is the main highway that traverses past eMdloti, specifically bypassing the village to the west due to its high sand dune. The M4 is also the main commuter linkage between eMdloti, uMhlanga and Durban in the south-west and La Mercy, Westbrook and Ballito in the north-east. Access to eMdloti from the M4 can be obtained through M27 Jabu Ngcobo Drive interchange. The M4 highway can also be used an alternative route to Ballito and KwaDukuza (via the R102 near Compensation) for motorists avoiding the tolled N2 highway.

The N2 North Coast Toll Route is a toll highway that bypasses eMdloti a further 500m to the west of the N2, running parallel to the M4. The national highway links eMdloti to the King Shaka International Airport and KwaDukuza in the north-west and Durban in the south-east. Access to eMdloti from the N2 can be obtained through the M27 Jabu Ngcobo Drive interchange (Exit 190).

eMdloti remains isolated from the rest of Greater Durban in the sense that it has a single access way which is the M27 Jabu Ngcobo Drive. The metropolitan route links eMdloti from the large traffic circle on South Beach, over the ridge to the M4, N2 and the R102 in Verulam to the west. Along with the M4, the R102 from Verulam can also be used an alternative route to Ballito (via M4 near Compensation) and KwaDukuza for motorists avoiding the tolled N2 highway.

2022 floods 

During April 2022, an unusual amount of heavy rainfall struck caused by the La Niña effect struck the eThekwini/Dolphin Coast/Ndwedwe/Umdoni Coast region and eMdloti was one of the worst effect areas of the deadly natural disaster. Several apartment buildings and residences in eMdloti were damaged due to landslides that occurred in the area as a result of the heavy rainfall.

This was largely due to two factors, the geographical location of eMdloti and the neighbouring Salta Sibaya development. eMdloti is located on ancient high/steep sand dunes which have a high clay component therefore making the area susceptible to mass movements like solifluction or landslides. At the same time, residents allegedly claimed the neighbouring development of Salta Sibaya part of the greater Sibaya Coastal development which sits on top of the dune/hill is to blame for the extensive damage occurred in eMdloti during heavy rainfalls.

References

External links
 Umdloti official website with pages describing climate and geography, nature and wildlife, diving spots, a whale register, tide tables, the activities of the Umdloti Conservancy, accommodation, restaurants, shops and services.

Populated places in eThekwini Metropolitan Municipality